Kadaladi in Tamil Nadu is 108 km from Madurai. Kadaladi is situated between Mudukulathur and Sayalgudi. It is a taluk headquarters and a revenue region of Ramanathapuram district.

History
Trade between Tamil Nadu and Sri Lanka took place via this town. Archaeologists have found some Jain idols of the 12th century. The fort at Kottaimedu Bjhihniknjk belongs to the 17th century, built on the banks of the Gundaaru River.

In pursuance to the Delimitation Act, 2002 in respect of the delimitation of Parliamentary and Assembly Constituencies in the State of Tamil Nadu, Kadaladi was merged with Mudhukulathur constituency in 2007 for representation in the Tamil Nadu Legislative Assembly and continues to be a part of Ramanathapuram Lok Sabha constituency.

Demography
As of 2001 India census GR India, Kadaladi had a population of 13,135. Males constituted 48% of the population and females 52%. Kadaladi had an average literacy rate of 75%, higher than the national average of 59.5%: male literacy was 80%, and female literacy 71%. In Kadaladi, 12% of the population were under six years of age.

Sri Madaswamy Temple, Sri Pathirakali Amman & Sri Muthu Mariyamman Temple, Sri KamatchiAmman Temple and Sri Muthumariamman Temple are the major temples in the region. Sri Pathirakali Amman & Sri KamatchiAmman & sri santhanamariyamman are the Gods worshipped in this location. There are mosques and churches also.

Sandhan Koodu festival by Muslims and Matha Chariot Process are celebrated by people of all religions. There is a bus stand, No Cinema Theater, three main Bazaar, and trade streets. Every Friday there is a weekly market. There are dairy farms in and around Kadaladi. Nadar, Maravars and Yadav are in large Numbers.

Education

 Government Higher Secondary School - Kadaladi 
 Saraswathi Widyalaya Metriculation School - Kadaladi 
 Kamarajar Metriculation School - Kadaladi 
 Government Middle School - Kadaladi (Melur) 
 Government Elementary School - Kadaladi 
 Govt Arts & Science college - Kadaladi
sangeetha matriculation school-kadaladi

Economy
Agriculture and animal breeding are the main businesses of the people of the region. There are 19 schools (nine primary, two upper primary, five secondary and 3 higher secondary schools). An arts and science college serves the student community of the town.

Politics 
Kadaladi town is part of Ramanathapuram (Lok Sabha constituency). Since 2007, Kadaladi has been merged with Mudhukulathur constituency for representation in the Tamil Nadu Legislative Assembly.

Notable Personalities
Thiru. S.Balakrishnan, and popularly known as So.Ba , a veteran Indian politician, President of Tamil Nadu Congress Committee (TNCC) and Member of the Legislative Assembly of Tamil Nadu for eighteen years and the Leader of the Opposition in the Tamil Nadu Legislative Assembly (Eleventh Assembly 1996-2001)

Actor Senthil, one of the comedians of the Tamil film industry, was born in Elanchembur nearby Muthukulathur.

References 

About kadaladi taluk

Revenue villages in Kadaladi taluk
Cities and towns in Ramanathapuram district